Clehonger is a village and civil parish in Herefordshire, England,  south west of Hereford. The population of this civil parish at the 2011 census was 1,382. Clehonger is from the old English 'Clay Slope.'

Infrastructure and services
The village hall is quite modern and has a pre-school group based there on some or most weekdays mornings. The village has a small shop with post office and a school for 5–11 year olds, which has approx 130-150 pupils. The school's catchment area includes Belmont (2 miles away, a suburb of Hereford). A Natural Gas main was laid to south Herefordshire in the early 1990s and since then most housing seems to have changed over to it. Broadband services became available in the village from June 2005.

The village has one pub - The Seven Stars. The Seven Stars was one of the first pubs in the County of Herefordshire to have a Petanque piste, and still has a team today. The village previously had a petrol station. However this was closed down around 2000, demolished, and the land used for housing in 2001.

Church 

The 12th century parish church is dedicated to All Saints and is a grade I building notable for its monuments to the local manorial family, the Pembridges.

Transport
Clehonger is served by buses primarily by two bus services: - the T14 trawscymru (Cardiff - Hereford via Hay-on-Wye and Brecon service) and 449 Yeomans (Madley - Hereford service).

The major road link is the B4349, which passes to the middle of the village.

Housing
Apart from the occasional farm cottage or farm house, the vast majority of housing in the village is predominantly a mix of post World War II council housing, mid-1960s buildings and 1970s/1980s buildings. The post World War II housing is mainly nearer the north side of the village, whilst the 1970s/1980s housing was built to the south and west sides. The mid-1960s housing occupies the middle of the village. In the 1970/1980s, bungalows and dormers seemed to have proliferated while the 1960s housing is the more traditional 3 or 4 bed semi-detached type.

References

External links

Multimap link
'Three Horse Shoes' Multimap link

Villages in Herefordshire